The 2016 UCI America Tour was the twelfth season for the UCI America Tour. The season began on January 8, 2016 with the Vuelta al Táchira and ended on October 2, 2016 with the Tobago Cycling Classic.

The points leader, based on the cumulative results of previous races, wears the UCI America Tour cycling jersey. Throughout the season, points are awarded to the top finishers of stages within stage races and the final general classification standings of each of the stages races and one-day events. The quality and complexity of a race also determines how many points are awarded to the top finishers, the higher the UCI rating of a race, the more points are awarded.

The UCI ratings from highest to lowest are as follows:
 Multi-day events: 2.HC, 2.1 and 2.2
 One-day events: 1.HC, 1.1 and 1.2

Events

Final standings

References

External links
 

 
UCI America Tour
2016 in road cycling
UCI
UCI